The 2021 CONCACAF Champions League (officially the 2021 Scotiabank CONCACAF Champions League for sponsorship reasons) was the 13th edition of the CONCACAF Champions League under its current name, and overall the 56th edition of the premier football club competition organized by CONCACAF, the regional governing body of North America, Central America, and the Caribbean.

Due to the COVID-19 pandemic, the tournament, which usually starts in mid-February each year, was started in April, and concluded with the final in October, which was played as a single-leg match hosted by the finalist which had the better performances in previous rounds.

Mexican club Tigres UANL were the title holders, but did not qualify for this tournament and were unable to defend their title. Monterrey, also from Mexico, won their fifth CONCACAF Champions League title, defeating fellow Mexican club América in the final to qualify for the 2021 FIFA Club World Cup.

Qualification
A total of 16 teams participate in the CONCACAF Champions League:
Ten teams which directly qualified for the tournament:
North American Zone: 9 teams (from three associations)
Caribbean Zone: 1 team (from one association)
Six teams qualified through the CONCACAF League (from between two and six associations)

Therefore, teams from between 6 and 10 out of the 41 CONCACAF member associations could participate in the CONCACAF Champions League.

North America
The nine direct berths for the North American Football Union (NAFU), which consisted of three member associations, were allocated as follows: four berths each for Mexico and the United States, and one berth for Canada.

For Mexico, the champions and runners-up of the Liga MX Apertura and Clausura Liguilla tournaments qualified for the CONCACAF Champions League. For the Apertura tournament, the playoff winners and runners-up qualified, while for the Clausura tournament, no playoffs were held due to the league's suspension; the two highest ranked teams in the regular season at the time of suspension instead qualified. If there were any teams which were finalists of both tournaments, the vacated berth was reallocated using a formula, based on regular season records, that ensured that two teams qualified via each tournament.

For the United States, four teams qualified for the CONCACAF Champions League, two through the Major League Soccer (MLS) season and two through its domestic cup competitions:
The champions of the MLS Cup, the championship match of the MLS Cup Playoffs.
The champions of the Supporters' Shield, awarded to the team with the best MLS regular season record.
The champions of the MLS is Back Tournament (for 2021 CONCACAF Champions League only, replacing the MLS regular season champions of either the Eastern Conference or Western Conference which were not the Supporters' Shield champions; team qualified regardless of whether they were from the United States or Canada, and should they also win the MLS Cup, the MLS Cup runners-up would qualify).
The champions of the 2019 U.S. Open Cup (for 2021 CONCACAF Champions League only, replacing the champions of the 2020 U.S. Open Cup because the tournament was not held that year).
If there were any teams which qualified through multiple berths, or if there was any Canada-based MLS team which were champions of the MLS Cup, the Supporters' Shield, or conference regular season (not applicable for 2021 CONCACAF Champions League), the vacated berth was reallocated to the U.S.-based team with the best MLS regular season record not yet qualified.

For Canada, the champions of the Canadian Championship, its domestic cup competition which awarded the Voyageurs Cup, were originally set to qualify for the CONCACAF Champions League. However, the final between Forge FC, champions of the Canadian Premier League, and Toronto FC could not be scheduled in time for the start of the tournament, and so it was then agreed upon that Toronto FC would be Canada's representative. While some Canada-based teams competed in MLS, they could not qualify through either the MLS regular season or playoffs. Moreover, the champions of the Canadian Premier League qualified for the CONCACAF League, meaning a second team from Canada (and a tenth team from North America) could qualify for the CONCACAF Champions League.

Central America
Teams from the Central American Football Union (UNCAF), which consisted of seven member associations, had to qualify for the CONCACAF Champions League through the CONCACAF League. A total of 18 teams from Central America qualified for the CONCACAF League through their domestic leagues. As all but four teams in the CONCACAF League were from Central America, between two and six teams from Central America could qualify for the CONCACAF Champions League.

Caribbean
Teams from the Caribbean Football Union (CFU), which consisted of 31 member associations, qualified for the CONCACAF Champions League either as champions of the CONCACAF Caribbean Club Championship, the first-tier subcontinental Caribbean club tournament, or through the CONCACAF League. Since 2018, the CONCACAF Caribbean Club Championship had been open to teams from professional leagues, where they could qualify as champions or runners-up of their respective association's league in the previous season.

Another three teams from the Caribbean qualified for the CONCACAF League, which were the runners-up and third-placed team of the CONCACAF Caribbean Club Championship, and the winners of a playoff between the fourth-placed team of the CONCACAF Caribbean Club Championship and the champions of the CONCACAF Caribbean Club Shield, the second-tier subcontinental Caribbean club tournament which was open to teams from non-professional leagues, where they could qualify as champions of their respective association's league in the previous season. Therefore, between one and four teams from the Caribbean could qualify for the CONCACAF Champions League.

CONCACAF League

Besides the ten direct entrants of the CONCACAF Champions League, another 22 teams (1 from North America, 18 from Central America, and 3 from the Caribbean) qualified for the CONCACAF League, a tournament held from July to November prior to the CONCACAF Champions League. The top six teams of the CONCACAF League (champions, runners-up, both losing semi-finalists and two play-in round winners) qualified for the CONCACAF Champions League.

Teams
The following 16 teams (from eight associations) qualified for the tournament.
North American Zone: 9 teams (from three associations)
Central American Zone: 5 teams (from three associations), all of them qualified through the 2020 CONCACAF League
Caribbean Zone: 2 teams (from two associations), one of them qualified through the 2020 CONCACAF League

In the following table, the number of appearances, last appearance, and previous best result count only those in the CONCACAF Champions League era starting from 2008–09 (not counting those in the era of the Champions' Cup from 1962 to 2008).

Notes

Draw

The draw for the 2021 CONCACAF Champions League was held on 10 February 2021, 19:00 EST (UTC−5), at the CONCACAF headquarters in Miami, United States.

The draw determined each tie in the round of 16 (numbered 1 through 8) between a team from Pot 1 and a team from Pot 2, each containing eight teams. The "Bracket Position Pots" (Pot A and Pot B) contained the bracket positions numbered 1 through 8 corresponding to each tie. The teams from Pot 1 were assigned a bracket position from Pot A and the teams from Pot 2 were assigned a bracket position from Pot B. Teams from the same association could not be drawn against each other in the round of 16 except for "wildcard" teams which replaced a team from another association.

The seeding of teams were based on the CONCACAF Club Index. The CONCACAF Club Index, instead of ranking each team, was based on the on-field performance of the teams that had occupied the respective qualifying slots in the previous five editions of the CONCACAF Champions League. To determine the total points awarded to a slot in any single edition of the CONCACAF Champions League, CONCACAF used the following formula:

The slots were assigned by the following rules:
For teams from North America, nine teams qualified based on criteria set by their association (e.g., tournament champions, runners-up, cup champions), resulting in an assigned slot (e.g., MEX1, MEX2) for each team. If a team from Canada qualified through the CONCACAF League, they would be ranked within their association, resulting in an assigned slot (i.e., CAN2) for them.
For teams from Central America, they qualified through the CONCACAF League, and were ranked per association by their CONCACAF League ranking, resulting in an assigned slot (e.g., CRC1, CRC2) for each team.
For teams from the Caribbean, the CONCACAF Caribbean Club Championship champions were assigned the Caribbean champion slot (i.e., CCC1). If teams from the Caribbean qualified through the CONCACAF League, they would be ranked per association by their CONCACAF League ranking, resulting in an assigned slot (e.g., JAM1, SUR1) for each team.

The 16 teams were distributed in the pots as follows:

Notes

Format
In the CONCACAF Champions League, the 16 teams played a single-elimination tournament. Each tie was played on a home-and-away two-legged basis, except the final which is played as a single-leg match.
In the round of 16, quarter-finals and semi-finals, the away goals rule was applied if the aggregate score is tied after the second leg. If still tied, a penalty shoot-out was used to determine the winner (Regulations Article 12.7).
In the final, extra time was played if the score was tied after the end of match. If the score is still tied after extra time, a penalty shoot-out was used to determine the winner (Regulations Article 12.8).

Schedule
The schedule of the competition is as follows.

Times are Eastern Daylight Time, i.e., UTC−4, as listed by CONCACAF (local times are in parentheses).

Bracket

Round of 16
In the round of 16, the matchups were decided by draw: R16-1 through R16-8. The teams from Pot 1 in the draw hosted the second leg.

Summary
The first legs were played on 6–8 April, and the second legs were played on 13–15 April 2021.

|}

Matches

Cruz Azul won 8–0 on aggregate.

Toronto FC won 3–2 on aggregate.

Monterrey won 6–1 on aggregate.

Columbus Crew SC won 5–0 on aggregate.

Philadelphia Union won 5–0 on aggregate.

Atlanta United FC won 2–0 on aggregate.

2–2 on aggregate. América won on away goals.

Portland Timbers won 7–2 on aggregate.

Quarter-finals
In the quarter-finals, the matchups were determined as follows:
QF1: Winners of R16-1 vs. Winners of R16-2
QF2: Winners of R16-3 vs. Winners of R16-4
QF3: Winners of R16-5 vs. Winners of R16-6
QF4: Winners of R16-7 vs. Winners of R16-8
The winners of round of 16 matchups 1, 3, 5 and 7 hosted the second leg.

Summary
The first legs were played on 27–28 April, and the second legs were played on 4–5 May 2021.

|}

Matches

Cruz Azul won 4–1 on aggregate.

Monterrey won 5–2 on aggregate.

Philadelphia Union won 4–1 on aggregate.

América won 4–2 on aggregate.

Semi-finals
In the semi-finals, the matchups were determined as follows:
SF1: Winners of QF1 vs. Winners of QF2
SF2: Winners of QF3 vs. Winners of QF4

The semi-finalists in each tie which had the better performance in previous rounds hosted the second leg.

Summary
The first legs were played on 11–12 August, and the second legs were played on 15–16 September 2021.

|}

Matches

Monterrey won 5–1 on aggregate.

América won 4–0 on aggregate.

Final

In the final (Winners of SF1 vs. Winners of SF2), the finalist which had the better performances in previous rounds hosted the single-leg match.

Match
The match was played on 28 October 2021.

Top goalscorers

Awards

See also
2020 CONCACAF League

Notes

References

External links

 
2021
1
Association football events postponed due to the COVID-19 pandemic
April 2021 sports events in North America
May 2021 sports events in North America
August 2021 sports events in North America
September 2021 sports events in North America
October 2021 sports events in North America